John Cadman may refer to:
John Cadman (convict), transported to Australia in 1797
John Cadman, 1st Baron Cadman, British mining engineer
John Cadman (sportsman) (1934-), English cricketer and field hockey player
Baron Cadman is a title in the Peerage of the United Kingdom